Sebastiania rigida is a species of flowering plant in the family Euphorbiaceae. It was originally described as Gymnanthes rigida Müll.Arg. in 1863. It is native to Minas Gerais and Rio de Janeiro, Brazil.

References

Plants described in 1863
Flora of Brazil
rigida